Revolt is an American music-oriented digital cable television network founded by Sean "Diddy" Combs and Andy Schuon that launched on October 21, 2013.

History

As part of its arrangement to acquire a minority interest in NBCUniversal, Comcast Corporation committed to carry several minority-owned networks. The arrangement followed pressure led by Maxine Waters in congressional hearings.

In April 2011, Comcast solicited proposals for minority owned networks. In February 2012, Comcast announced distribution arrangements for four networks, including Revolt. The four announced networks and six forthcoming stations are being chosen from among in excess of 100 proposals to begin airing by 2020.

On October 1, 2013, the network announced that it would debut in New York, Los Angeles and Chicago on October 21.

AT&T U-verse added the SD channel on July 27, 2015 and the HD channel on November 24, 2015. DirecTV added it on December 24, 2015.

Dutch TV channel
On 18 October 2019 Ziggo announced that it would add a Dutch version of Revolt on 1 November 2019. The programming consists of interviews, the latest music news, hip-hop documentaries, live events and music videos. The first months of broadcast the American version of the channel will be shown with a 6-hour delay. From January 2020, Dutch programs will also be broadcast. The Dutch channel is a collaboration between Revolt US, Dutch record label TopNotch and AreaMedia.

On 1 February 2021, the channel closed.

Programming
Revolt is primarily dedicated to Urban contemporary music, with music video blocks comprising the majority of the network's afternoon schedule. Revolt's original programming also has covered social justice issues targeting African Americans.

Revolt Films
Revolt Films is a separate entity from the network, using the same name for brand association. It specializes in developing, producing, and financing films and original television content. Its first full-length feature film was Lawless. Other credits include Dope.

Notes

External links
Revolt.tv website

REVOLT TV
English-language television stations in the United States
Television channels and stations established in 2012
Music video networks in the United States
Music television channels
Television networks in the United States
African-American television networks